Lisa Rachel Zeno Churgin (born January 20, 1955) is an American film editor with more than 25 film credits; she was nominated for the Academy Award for Best Film Editing for the 1999 film The Cider House Rules (directed by Lasse Hallström). Since 2002, Churgin has also served as the president of the Motion Picture Editors Guild. Churgin's editing of House of Sand and Fog (directed by Vadim Perelman-2003) was nominated for the Satellite Award for Best Editing.

Churgin has been elected to membership in the American Cinema Editors.

Filmography

Films

Television

References

External links

 Churgin describes her collaboration with director Lasse Hallström on The Cider House Rules.

American film editors
American Cinema Editors
Living people
1955 births